The National Fire Protection Association (NFPA) is a U.S. based international nonprofit organization devoted to eliminating death, injury, property and economic loss due to fire, electrical and related hazards. As of 2018, the NFPA claims to have 50,000 members and 9,000 volunteers working with the organization through its 250 technical committees.

History 

In 1895, a Committee on Automatic Sprinkler Protection was formed in Massachusetts by men affiliated with several fire insurance companies and a pipe manufacturer to develop a uniform standard for the design and installation of fire sprinkler systems. At the time, there were nine such standards in effect within  of Boston, Massachusetts, and such diversity was causing great difficulties for plumbers working in the New England region.

The next year, the committee published its initial report on a uniform standard, and went on to form the NFPA in late 1896. The committee's initial report evolved into NFPA 13, Standard for the Installation of Sprinkler Systems, which is now the most widely used fire sprinkler standard.  

Around 1904, the NFPA began to expand its membership from affiliates of fire insurance companies to many other organizations and individuals, and also expanded its mission beyond promulgating fire sprinkler standards.

Codes and standards 

The association publishes more than 300 consensus codes and standards that are intended to minimize the possibility and effects of fire and other risks. The codes and standards are administered by more than 250 technical committees, consisting of approximately 8,000 volunteers.

Mascot

Sparky the Fire Dog is the official mascot of the National Fire Protection Association. Created in 1951 to promote fire safety education for children, he is a Dalmatian dressed in firefighting gear.

A children's book written about Sparky by Don Hoffman was published in 2011. He serves as the spokesdog for Fire Prevention Week each October in the United States and Canada.

References

External links

 
 Official website for Sparky the Fire Dog
 Child education resources

Electrical safety standards organizations
Fire protection organizations
Firefighting in the United States
Non-profit organizations based in Massachusetts
Occupational safety and health organizations
Organizations established in 1896
Quasi-public entities in the United States
Quincy, Massachusetts
Standards organizations in the United States